Earther is an environmental news website owned by Univision Communications and was launched in September 2017.

History
Earther launched with the mission to chronicle three main topics: "The future of Earth," "The future of humans on Earth," and "The future of life on Earth."
Managing editor Maddie Stone said that the site was created because it "felt like a salient and important time to create a destination for environmental news where folks can go to read up on the latest studies, but also hear the latest news about how natural disasters are affecting people, the big important environmental policies being raised around the world, and some of the biggest conservation stories."

On June 25, 2019, Earther was named SAPO's website of the day.

References

External links

Former Univision Communications subsidiaries
Fusion Media Group
American news websites
Internet properties established in 2017
2017 establishments in the United States
American environmental websites